The President of the Government of Catalonia is one of the bodies that the Statute of Autonomy of Catalonia stipulates as part of the Generalitat de Catalunya, others being the Parliament, the government, the  and the Síndic de Greuges. The president also serves as head of government of Catalonia, leading the executive branch of the Generalitat de Catalunya, the Catalan government.

The current president is Pere Aragonès of the Republican Left of Catalonia, following his election in 21 May 2021 after the 2021 Catalan elections.

The current presidency
The president is elected by the Parliament of Catalonia and appointed by the King of Spain. The office has both representative and governmental functions.

Representative functions
The president holds the highest representation of the Generalitat and the ordinary of the State in the autonomous community. He is also in charge of the domestic relations with the other bodies of the State and with the autonomous communities of Spain that Catalonia shares interests with. The President is also responsible for calling for elections (which must be done at least every four years) and appointing the regional ministers (officially called consellers) and other high offices as stipulated by law. As ordinary representative of the State in Catalonia, he promulgates laws in the autonomous community in name of the King.

Governmental functions
The president is member of the Catalan government and leads and coordinates it. He selects and may dismiss the ministers, call for a meeting of the Executive Council, and act as its chairman. Further, he signs decrees accorded by the Executive Council and orders them to be published. He can also call for an extraordinary meeting of the Catalan parliament which, given the case, can be ordered to be dissolved or hold a general debate.

Moreover, the president must coordinate the legislative agenda of its government, the elaboration of general normatives and give all the information that Parliament may decide to request.

See also

List of presidents of the Government of Catalonia
List of political parties in Catalonia
History of Catalonia

References

External links
President of the Government of Catalonia